Mumia xiangluensis is a bacterium from the genus Mumia which has been isolated from the rhizosphere of the plant Peucedanum praeruptorum from Mount Xianglu, China.

References 

Propionibacteriales
Bacteria described in 2016